Thread of Lies (lit. Elegant Lies) is a 2014 South Korean film based on the 2009 bestselling novel Elegant Lies by Kim Ryeo-ryeong. Directed by Lee Han, it starred Kim Hee-ae (in her first film in 21 years), Go Ah-sung, Kim Yoo-jung and Kim Hyang-gi.

Thread of Lies deals with the aftermath of a suicide by a 14-year-old girl. The nonlinear narrative follows her mother and older sister who set out to solve the mystery of her death, insinuating themselves into the life of the girl who bullied her.

Plot
Hyun-sook (Kim Hee-ae) is a widowed single mother who is raising two teenage daughters while working at a big grocery store. One day, her youngest child, 14-year-old Cheon-ji (Kim Hyang-gi) suddenly commits suicide by hanging without even leaving a note. To Hyun-sook and her older daughter Man-ji (Go Ah-sung), Cheon-ji was the sweet child of the family who rarely complained and studied hard, while always trying to comfort her hardworking, often-weary mother. Struggling with guilt and anger, and not knowing why Cheon-ji chose to kill herself, the two women wonder whether there was something they missed or something they could have said or done. Flashbacks of Cheon-ji's past show that she had been the victim of cruel acts of bullying at her middle school, led by Hwa-yeon (Kim Yoo-jung), the prettiest and most popular girl in class whose true callous and manipulative nature hides a tortured soul.

Cast

Kim Hee-ae as Hyun-sook
Go Ah-sung as Lee Man-ji
Kim Yoo-jung as Kim Hwa-yeon
Kim Hyang-gi as Lee Cheon-ji
Yoo Ah-in as Choo Sang-bak
Sung Dong-il as Kwak Man-ho
Chun Woo-hee as Kwak Mi-ran
Yoo Yeon-mi as Kwak Mi-ra
Park Soo-young as Mr. Im
Kim Jung-young as Hwa-yeon's mother
Lee Jae-gu as Hwa-yeon's father
Kim Ji-hoon as Hyun-sook's co-worker, the dumplings guy
Jang Ah-young as Teacher Lee
Lee Young-eun as Mi-so
Park Ji-young as Soo-kyung 
Han Sung-yong as Park, Chinese restaurant delivery man

Critical reception
Luke Ryan Baldock of The Hollywood News called it "the best film of the year so far," with "the best exploration of bullying ever seen on-screen, as well as being an uplifting tale of life after death and the importance of understanding." He also praised the script as "brave" for "[tackling] such complex issues in a fair, balanced, and non-judgmental way," and the acting as "miraculous across the board, with the young cast taking centre stage and representing the full gamut of emotions."

Describing it as a "superbly constructed drama," Richard Kuipers of Variety wrote, "Rarely, if ever, has the topic of teenage bullying been examined in such forensic detail and delivered with such devastating emotional impact," and that "helmer Lee Han maintains perfect tonal control and elicits fine performances from a predominantly female cast."

Box office
Thread of Lies was released in theaters on March 13, 2014. It took the No. 1 spot at the domestic box office, the first local film to do so in six weeks, by drawing 182,620 viewers on its opening weekend. According to the Korean Film Council, the film had approximately 680,000 admissions in its first week, earning  (or ).

Distributor CGV Movie Collage said the film initially had problems going into production because investors doubted its mainstream appeal. But the film resonated with audiences, in a country where suicide, particularly among youths, is a major social issue (Korea has the highest suicide rate among developed/OECD countries). Select theaters screened a barrier-free version, with subtitles/narration for the blind and hearing impaired. Special screenings also took place for student and teacher groups, and the main cast members participated in an anti-school bullying campaign on March 27, 2014.

After 32 days in cinemas, the film grossed  from 1,619,188 admissions.

Awards and nominations

References

External links
 
Thread of Lies at CJ Entertainment

2014 films
South Korean drama films
South Korean mystery films
Films about bullying
Films about suicide
Films directed by Lee Han
2010s Korean-language films
Films based on South Korean novels
2010s South Korean films